International French School of Kathmandu (EFIK) is a private international school in Nepal delivering the French National Curriculum with multilingual education in French, English and Nepali. International French School of Kathmandu is listed as a French school located outside the territory of French Republic and has the official status of "French School Abroad". It is part of the Agency for French Education Abroad network (AEFE). The school operates under the responsibility of Parents' Association and its board members.

The school was founded in 1987 in Gairidhara as a Kindergarten. The school was first named "Badaboum". In 1990, the school moved to Lazimpat to its current premises. In 2011, the school carried out an earthquake-proofing of the buildings.

Since 2016, International French School of Kathmandu opened a Lower-Secondary section (from age 11 to 16) through French Online-tutored education (CNED).

External links 
 www.efiktm.com Website created in 2013 and updated in 2016
 www.ecolenepal.com/ Website created in 2008
 School page on AEFE website

Nepal
International schools in Nepal
Schools in Kathmandu
Educational institutions established in 1987
1987 establishments in Nepal